Chlorocalis maternaschulzei is a species of praying mantis in the family Mantidae and tribe Hierodulini.  Records of this species are from the seasonal tropical forests of Thailand and  Vietnam; the type specimen is from Nakhon Ratchasima Province.

References

External links 

Hierodulinae
Mantodea of Southeast Asia
Insects described in 2019